Hedwig Village is a city in Harris County, Texas, United States. The population was 2,370 at the 2020 census.

History
The Spring Branch Memorial area was originally settled by German immigrants in the 19th century. Hedwig Village's name originates from Hedwig Road, which was built on the property of Hedwig Jankowski Schroeder; Schroeder emigrated from Germany to Texas in 1906 to help her sister operate a business in Houston. There she met, and married, Henry Schroeder, son of Jacob Schroeder one of the area's earliest immigrants. They established their home and farmed in the area now Hedwig Village.

In the mid 1950s, effort to form a Spring Branch municipality failed. Hedwig Village was incorporated on December 23, 1954 and established a zoning ordinance in 1955. Because of the 1955 incorporation, Houston did not incorporate Hedwig Village's territory into its city limits, while Houston annexed surrounding areas that were unincorporated. Hedwig Village incorporated because residents feared that Houston would annex them. Around 1963, residents of Hedwig Villages and other Memorial villages wanted what Gia Gustilo of the Houston Chronicle referred to as "a more country-like atmosphere in close proximity to Houston." Laverne Coller, a resident quoted in the Houston Chronicle who moved to Hedwig Village in 1963, was paraphrased by Gustilo as "Hedwig Village is unique among the villages in that it was the only municipality to accept the existing commercial sector, which was quite a bonus to the city's revenues."

In 1960 the city had 1,182 residents. By 1966 the community had two schools, one library, and two churches. By 1970 the city had 3,255 residents, and in 1971 the city completed a park. The city had 3,994 residents in 1980 and 2,616 in 1990. Coller said in 2003 that many children of early Hedwig Village residents had begun to settle the Hedwig Village area. In 2003 Coller, as paraphrased by Gustilo, said "Despite the changes, several of her old neighbors remain and the camaraderie with new residents is good."

Geography

Hedwig Village is located at  (29.779990, –95.519412).

This makes Hedwig Village one of the smallest municipalities in Harris County.

Cityscape 
When Hedwig Village was first established, houses were similar to ranch houses and there were more private dirt roads than paved streets. Katy Road (now Interstate 10, Katy Freeway) had many neighborhood stores, according to Laverne Coller.

In 2003, Edith Spang, a former librarian at the Spring Branch Memorial Branch Library quoted in the Houston Chronicle, said that as time passed, the civic locations, including the library; the medical care facilities; the shopping venues; and the traffic were all parts of Hedwig Village's growth Spang remarked that Hedwig Village "has definitely changed along with the other villages. It's lost the sleepy little country atmosphere." Coller said that none of the stores that had originally existed when she moved still existed by 2003.

Demographics

As of the 2020 United States census, there were 2,370 people, 989 households, and 720 families residing in the city.

As of the census of 2000, there were 2,334 people, 956 households, and 668 families residing in the city. The population density was 2,706.5 people per square mile (1,047.9/km2). There were 1,038 housing units at an average density of 1,203.7/sq mi (466.0/km2). The racial makeup of the city was 81.41% White, 1.33% African American, 0.17% Native American, 12.43% Asian, 0.04% Pacific Islander, 2.01% from other races, and 2.61% from two or more races. Hispanic or Latino of any race were 6.26% of the population.

There were 956 households, out of which 35.8% had children under the age of 18 living with them, 55.6% were married couples living together, 11.2% had a female householder with no husband present, and 30.1% were non-families. 27.4% of all households were made up of individuals, and 9.9% had someone living alone who was 65 years of age or older. The average household size was 2.44 and the average family size was 2.99.

In the city, the population was spread out, with 26.6% under the age of 18, 5.4% from 18 to 24, 26.9% from 25 to 44, 25.8% from 45 to 64, and 15.3% who were 65 years of age or older. The median age was 41 years. For every 100 females, there were 89.4 males. For every 100 females age 18 and over, there were 83.5 males.

The median income for a household in the city was $66,250, and the median income for a family was $101,928. Males had a median income of $69,375 versus $41,316 for females. The per capita income for the city was $52,153. About 3.0% of families and 4.6% of the population were below the poverty line, including 6.1% of those under age 18 and 4.0% of those age 65 or over.

Infrastructure and government

As of 2022 the mayor of Hedwig Village is Tom Jinks. The council members are, in their respective council positions by number, Scott Davis, Patrick J. Breckon, Clay Trozzo, Matt Woodruff, and Shirley Rouse.

The Village Fire Department serves all of the Memorial villages. Laverne Coller said that voter turnout numbers are high in Hedwig Village, and that "[t]he people in Hedwig Village are a very responsible, dedicated group of citizens. We have had council people who serve term after term voluntarily even though they don't get much glory."

Hedwig Village operates its own police force. The village is within the Memorial Villages Water Authority. Laverne Coller said that, as paraphrased by Gia Gustilo of the Houston Chronicle, "seems to attract professionals perhaps" because Hedwig Village has its own police force.

Harris County Precinct Three, headed by Steve Radack as of 2008, serves Hedwig Village.

Hedwig Village is located in District 133 of the Texas House of Representatives. As of 2022 Jim Murphy represents the district. Hedwig Village is within District 7 of the Texas Senate; as of 2022 Paul Bettencourt represents the district.

Hedwig Village is in Texas's 7th congressional district; in 2008, The pro-Republican Party publication Human Events identified the zip code 77024 as the zip code that gave the eighth largest contribution to John McCain's 2008 U.S. Presidential Election campaign. The zip code, which includes Hedwig Village, gave $540,309 United States dollars by October 24, 2008. As of 2019, however, the 7th congressional district is represented by a Democrat, Lizzie Pannill Fletcher.

Harris Health System (formerly Harris County Hospital District) designated Northwest Health Center for ZIP code 77024. The nearest public hospital is Ben Taub General Hospital in the Texas Medical Center.

Parks and recreation 

The city operates Hedwig Park, located on Corbindale Road. Hedwig Park has picnic areas and gazebos. It is in proximity to the Spring Branch Memorial Library. The Houston Business Journal said "Children find the location especially exciting because it's just across the street from the Village Fire Department." The park in Hedwig Village is named after Hedwig Jankowski Schroeder.

Education

Colleges and universities 
Spring Branch ISD (and therefore Hedwig Village) is served by the Houston Community College System. The Northwest College operates the nearby Spring Branch Campus in Memorial City, Houston.

Primary and secondary schools

Public schools 

Hedwig Village is served by the Spring Branch Independent School District, which has its headquarters in Hedwig Village.

All residents are assigned to Wildcat Way School in Houston for preschool. 

Some Hedwig Village students are zoned to Memorial Drive Elementary School in Piney Point Village. Some Hedwig Village students are zoned to Bunker Hill Elementary School in Bunker Hill Village.

All Hedwig Village students are zoned to Spring Branch Middle School and Memorial High School, which are located in Hedwig Village.

Gallery of public schools

Private schools 
A Pre-K through 8th grade Catholic school called the St. Cecilia Catholic School, operated by the Roman Catholic Archdiocese of Houston is located in Hedwig Village. A nearby Kindergarten through 12th grade  girls' Catholic school called the Duchesne Academy is located near Hedwig Village in Houston. Nearby Holy Spirit Episcopal School offers placement for infants through 8th grade.

Other nearby private schools include The Kinkaid School (Piney Point Village), The Monarch School (one campus in Houston and one campus in Hilshire Village; moving to a new Houston campus in Spring 2009) and The Parish School.

Public libraries 

The Harris County Public Library (HCPL) system operates the Spring Branch Memorial Branch at 930 Corbindale Road in Hedwig Village. The  branch opened in 1975.

Media
The Houston Chronicle is the area regional newspaper.

The Memorial Examiner is a local newspaper distributed in the community.

Postal services
The United States Postal Service location serving 77024 is the Memorial Park Post Office at 10505 Town and Country Way, Houston, Texas, 77024-9998. This City of Hedwig Village is now officially recognized as a deliverable address. Residents and businesses can now use Hedwig Village, TX 77024 as an address line.

See also

References

External links
 City of Hedwig Village official website
 

Cities in Texas
Cities in Harris County, Texas
Greater Houston